Manfred Bilderl (born 24 September 1967) is a German professional darts player currently playing in Professional Darts Corporation events.

He qualified for the 2017 European Darts Trophy, where he lost 6–1 to Jonny Clayton. The following year he qualified for the 2018 German Darts Masters in the 2018 World Series of Darts, where he lost 6–0 to Raymond van Barneveld in the first round.

Bilderl also made it through to the 2019 International Darts Open, but was beaten 6–1 by Luke Woodhouse.

References

External links

Living people
German darts players
Professional Darts Corporation associate players
1967 births